GSTN may refer to:

 General Switched Telephone Network
 Goods and Services Tax Network, an Indian not-for-profit, non-government firm